State Route 354 (SR 354) is a primary state highway in the U.S. state of Virginia. Known as River Road, the state highway runs  from a dead end near Bertrand north to SR 3 near Litwalton in western Lancaster County.

SR 354 is a Virginia Byway north of Ottoman.

Route description

SR 354 begins at a dead end on Whitehouse Creek, an estuarine tributary of the Corrotoman River. The state highway heads west and northwest along the peninsula between the Western Branch of the Corrotoman River to the east and the Rappahannock River to the west. SR 354 passes through the hamlets of Bertrand, Senora, and Ottoman, the last the site of a free ferry across the Western Branch. North of Mollusk, the state highway meets the southern end of SR 201 (White Chapel Road). SR 354 continues through Somers, which lies between Nuttsville to the east and Belle Isle State Park to the west on the Rappahannock River. The state highway passes through Litwalton and crosses Balls Branch of Lancaster Creek before reaching its northern terminus at SR 3 (Historyland Highway). The SR 3 junction is just east of where SR 3 crosses Lancaster Creek into Richmond County.

Major intersections

References

External links

Virginia Highways Project: VA 354

354
State Route 354
354